The Bridge over Arkansas River in Johnson Village, Colorado, near Buena Vista, is a Pratt deck truss bridge built in 1937. It was listed on the National Register of Historic Places in 1985.

It is a "visually impressive"  bridge, carrying a  roadway on a skewed line high over the Arkansas River. It was designed by the Colorado Department of Highways and was built by contractor M.E. Carlson.

The bridge carries U.S. Highway 24 over the Arkansas River.

References

External links

Bridges on the National Register of Historic Places in Colorado
National Register of Historic Places in Chaffee County, Colorado
Bridges completed in 1937
1937 establishments in Colorado